Mangelia vacavillensis is a minute extinct species of sea snail, a marine gastropod mollusk in the family Mangeliidae.

Description
The length of the shell attains 4.7 mm, its diameter 2.3 mm.

Distribution
This extinct marine species was found in Middle Eocene strata in California, USA.

References

External links
 Worldwide Mollusc Species Data Base : Mangelia vacavillensis

vacavillensis
Gastropods described in 1923